The France men's national pitch and putt team represents France in the pitch and putt international competitions. It is managed by the Association Française de Pitch & Putt (AFPP).

In 1999 the "Association Française de Pitch & Putt" was one of the founders of the European Pitch and Putt Association, the governing body that develops the pitch and putt in Europe and stages a biennial European Team Championship, where France reached the third place in 2003. In 2006 participated in the creation of the Federation of International Pitch and Putt Associations (FIPPA), that stages a biennial World Cup Team Championship. France obtained the third place in 2004.

In 2009, vacated their membership of FIPPA and EPPA and joined another international association, IPPA.

National team

Players
National team in the World Cup 2008
 Jean-Claude Richard
 Christian Auziere
 Pierre Rongier
 Manoj Chitnavis

National team in the European Championship 2007
Jean-Claude Richard
Jean-Louis Olesiak
Christian Auziere
Joel Dehove
Adrien Delcausse
Jean-Michel Biau

Notes and references

See also
World Cup Team Championship
European Team Championship

External links
AFPP Association Française de Pitch & Putt

National pitch and putt teams
Pitch and putt